is an action video game developed by Nintendo and HAL Laboratory and published by Nintendo. The original arcade version was released for the Nintendo VS. System internationally as Vs. Balloon Fight, while its Nintendo Entertainment System counterpart was released in Japan in 1985 and internationally in 1986.

The gameplay is similar to the 1982 game Joust from Williams Electronics. The home Nintendo Entertainment System version was ported to the NEC PC-8801 in October 1985, the Sharp X1 in November 1985, the Game Boy Advance as Balloon Fight-e for the e-Reader in the United States on September 16, 2002, and as part of the Famicom Mini Series in Japan on May 21, 2004. It was later rereleased through Nintendo's Virtual Console and NES Classic Edition. It was released on Nintendo Switch Online in 2018.

Gameplay

The player controls an unnamed Balloon Fighter with two balloons attached to his helmet. Repeatedly pressing the A button or holding down the B button causes the Balloon Fighter to flap his arms and rise into the air. If a balloon is popped, the player's flotation is decreased, making it harder to rise. A life is lost if both balloons are popped by enemy Balloon Fighters, if the player falls in the water, gets eaten by the large piranha near the surface of the water, or is hit by lightning.

There are two modes of play: the 1-player/2-player game where the goal is to clear the screen of enemies, and Balloon Trip where the goal is to avoid obstacles in a side-scrolling stage. The original arcade game does not include Balloon Trip, but all the level layouts are completely different so as to take advantage of vertical scrolling in addition to some minor gameplay differences.

1-player/2-player game
Defeat all of the enemies on screen to clear the stage. This mode can be played alone or co-operatively with a second player. Each player starts with three extra lives. The 3DS Balloon Fight port comes with the Download Play option, that allows you to play along with a friend that has another 3DS system.

Enemy Balloon Fighters float around the screen and the player must hit their balloons to defeat them. The enemy can also fall into the water or be eaten by the fish while flying close to the water's surface. If an enemy is defeated or falls into the water, a bubble will rise up the screen which can be hit for extra points. As play progresses through the stages, the number of enemies and platforms increases.

Every three stages is a bonus stage, where the goal is to burst all of the balloons that float up the screen from the chimneys at the bottom.

Balloon Trip
A single-player game where the goal is to avoid the lightning sparks and collect the balloons, aiming to move up the ranks and compete for the high score. The player starts with one life.

Ports, sequels, and references
The home Nintendo Entertainment System version was ported to the NEC PC-8801 in October 1985, the Sharp X1 in November 1985, the Game Boy Advance as Balloon Fight-e for the e-Reader in the United States on September 16, 2002, and as part of the Famicom Mini Series in Japan on May 21, 2004. It can also be played in Animal Crossing for the GameCube.

Nintendo released a Game & Watch version of the same name, based on the NES version's Balloon Trip mode. The protagonist is "a Balloon Man". Unlike Balloon Fighters, Balloon Men use rocket suits instead of flapping their hands to elevate while holding balloons.

A sequel to Balloon Fight called Balloon Kid was released in October 1990 in North America and on January 31, 1991, in Europe for the Game Boy, which expands from the game's roots and revamped it into a full platforming adventure. This title was not released in Japan on the Game Boy, but colorized versions titled as Hello Kitty World (published by Character Soft) for the Famicom and Balloon Fight GB for the Game Boy Color were later released only in Japan.

In September 2001, the game was ported to the Sharp Zaurus series of PDAs.

Balloon Fighter and Flipper trophies are obtainable in Super Smash Bros. Melee, and the Flipper is also a usable item, replacing the Bumper from the previous game. The Balloon Fighter was considered for a playable role during the development of Super Smash Bros. Melee, but the Ice Climbers were chosen instead. The original background music for the Balloon Trip in Balloon Fight can be heard in Melees Icicle Mountain stage as alternate music. The giant fish makes a cameo appearance in Super Smash Bros. Brawl. It appears on the Ice Climber-based stage, the Summit, where it tries to attack the players from the sea. In addition, a remixed version of the main theme, titled "Balloon Trip" is available for the Summit stage as well. Stickers of the Balloon Fighter and the Balloon Fight Enemy can be collected in Brawl. In addition, the Villager from the Animal Crossing series uses the Balloon Fighter's helmet as one of his special moves in Super Smash Bros. for Nintendo 3DS and Wii U. In the 3DS version of the same game, a stage based on Balloon Fight appears with the original 8-bit graphics; the same stage returns in Super Smash Bros. Ultimate, Balloon Fighter appears as a Spirit in said game.

In the WarioWare, Inc. series, some of 9-Volt's games are based on Balloon Fight. In WarioWare: Smooth Moves, there is also a minigame functioning as a three-dimensional version of Balloon Trip; players use the Wii Remote only for the microgame version, and also use the Nunchuk in the complete 3D Balloon Trip.

The original tech demo for Yoshi Touch & Go was called Yoshi's Balloon Trip. Balloon Fight is the theme for Touch Mode in Tetris DS, although the mode itself has almost nothing to do with the game other than the music and decorative graphics.

On April 12, 2007, Club Nintendo released Tingle's Balloon Fight for the Nintendo DS, an exclusive game featuring Tingle, a Nintendo character who originated from The Legend of Zelda series. The game is a remake of the home version, featuring the "Balloon Fight" and "Balloon Trip" modes. The levels are expanded slightly to utilize both screens, similar to the arcade game except based entirely around the NES levels. A gallery that contained concept art was also included, where each piece could be unlocked by completing specific in-game tasks.

The Balloon Fighter appears in Super Mario Maker as an unlockable Mystery Mushroom costume as part of an update.

Balloon Fight has been re-released as part of Nintendo's Virtual Console. On June 8, 2007, Balloon Fight was released in Europe, followed by a release in North America on July 16, 2007, and Japan on November 12, 2007. The game was released on Virtual Console for Nintendo 3DS as part of that system's Ambassador Program in September 2011.

In Nintendo Land, there is an attraction called Balloon Trip Breeze that is very similar to Balloon Trip from the original Balloon Fight.

The game was released on the Wii U Virtual Console service on January 23, 2013, in North America until February 23, 2013, as part of a promotion celebrating the 30th anniversary of the release of the original Nintendo Famicom. Balloon Fight became the first Wii U Virtual Console title to be released. On November 11, 2016, the game (alongside 29 other games) was included in the NES Classic Edition (Nintendo Classic Mini in Europe).

The NES version of Balloon Fight was re-released as one of the launch titles for Nintendo Switch Online on September 18, 2018.

The original arcade version, Vs. Balloon Fight, was ported by Hamster Corporation and released on the Nintendo Switch Arcade Archives on December 27, 2019.

Release 
Similar to other early Nintendo titles, the exact date of the console release is difficult to pinpoint. It was first scheduled for June of 1986, was later changed to August of 1986, but very likely came out in September.

List of Balloon Fight games, ports and sequels

Notes

References

External links
IGN's coverage of Balloon Fight (Famicom Mini Series)

1984 video games
Action video games
Arcade video games
Game & Watch games
Game Boy Color games
Nintendo Entertainment System games
MSX games
NEC PC-8801 games
Nintendo arcade games
Nintendo games
Nintendo Research & Development 1 games
Nintendo Vs. Series games
PlayChoice-10 games
Sharp X1 games
Virtual Console games
Virtual Console games for Wii U
Video game clones
Video games scored by Hirokazu Tanaka
Video games designed by Yoshio Sakamoto
Video games developed in Japan
Nintendo Switch Online games
Virtual Console games for Nintendo 3DS
Multiplayer and single-player video games
Hamster Corporation games